Stigmella porphyreuta is a moth of the family Nepticulidae. It was described by Edward Meyrick in 1917 and is endemic to Natal, South Africa.

References

Nepticulidae
Moths described in 1917
Endemic moths of South Africa